The nickel organic acid salts are organic acid salts of nickel. In many of these the ionised organic acid acts as a ligand.

Nickel acetate has the formula (CH3COO)2Ni·4H2O. It has monodentate acetate and hydrogen bonding. A dihydrate also exists. Nickel acetate is used to seal anodised aluminium.

Nickel formate  decomposes when heated to yield carbon dioxide, carbon monoxide, hydrogen, water and finely divided porous nickel. All the nickel atoms are six coordinated, but half have four water molecules and two formate oxygens close to the atom, and the other half are coordinated by six oxygens of formate groups.

Aspergillus niger is able to dispose of otherwise toxic levels of nickel in its environment by forming nickel oxalate dihydrate crystals. nickel oxalate can also be formed in to various nanorods and nanofibres by use of surfacants. When heated nickel oxalate dihydrate dehydrates at 258° and decomposes to Ni metal over 316 °C. Double oxalate salts where oxalate is a ligand on the nickel atom may be called oxalatonickelates.

Other organic acid salts of nickel include nickel oleate, nickel propionate, nickel butyrate, nickel caprylate, nickel lactate, nickel benzoate, nickel bis(acetyl acetonate), nickel salicylate, nickel alkyl phenyl salicylate. Nickel stearate forms a green solution, however when precipitated with alcohol a gel is produced, that also contains a mixture of basic salts, and free stearic acid.

Nickel malonate, and nickel hydrogen malonate both crystallise with two molecules of water. They decomposes when heated to yield gaseous water, carbon dioxide, carbon monoxide, ethanol, acetic acid, methyl formate and ethyl formate. Nickel acetate exists as an intermediate and the final result is that solid nickel, nickel oxide, Ni3C and carbon remain. With malonate nickel can form a bis-malonato-nickelate anion, which can form double salts. Nickel maleate can be made from maleic acid and nickel carbonate in boiling water. A dihydrate crystallises from the water solution. Nickel fumarate prepared from fumaric acid and nickel carbonate is pale green as a tetrahydrate, and mustard coloured as an anhydride. It decomposes when heated to 300° to 340° in vacuum. Decomposition mostly produces nickel carbide, carbon dioxide, carbon monoxide and methane. But also produced were butanes, benzene, toluene, and organic acid.

Nickel succinate can form metal organic framework compounds.

Nickel citrate complexes are found in leaves of some nickel accumulating plant species in New Caledonia such as Pycnandra acuminata. Citrate complexes include NiHcit, NiHcit23−, Nicit−, Nicit24−, and Ni2H2cit24−. (ordered from low to high pH). Also there is Ni4H4cit35−. Nickel citrate is important in nickel plating. When precipitation of nickel citrate is attempted a gel forms. This apparently consists of tangled fibres of [(C6H6O7)Ni]n, which can be reduced to nickel metal fibres less than a micron thick, and meters long. Double nickel citrates exist, including tetraanion citrate when pH is over 9.5. An amorphous nickel iron citrate Ni3Fe6O4(C6H6O7)8·6H2O produces carbon monoxide, carbon dioxide and acetone when heated over 200 °C leaving Trevorite, NiFe2O4 a nickel ferrite. A green crystalline nickel citrate with formula Ni3(C6H5O7)2·10H2O melts at 529K and decomposition starts at 333K.

Nickel glutarate in the form called Mil-77, [Ni20{(C5H6O4)20(H2O)8}]⋅40H2O is pale green. It crystallises in a porous structure containing twenty member rings. The 40 water molecules "occluded" in the porous channels come out when it is heated to 150 °C retaining the crystal framework. At 240 °C the crystal form changes and over 255° the remaining water is lost. Between 330° and 360° the organic components burn and it is destroyed.

Cyclopropane carboxylic acid forms two basic salts with nickel, a hydrate  with density 1.554 Mg/m3 and an anhydrous form Ni5(OH)2(C4H5O2)8 with density 2.172 mg/m3.

Nickel trifluoroacetate tetrahydrate exists, as well as two emerald green acid trifluoroacetates, a bridged trinuclear form [Ni3(CF3COO)6(CF3COOH)6](CF3COOH) and a hydrated acid form [Ni3(CF3COO)6(CF3COOH)2(H2O)4](CF3COOH)2 both with triclinic crystal form. The first has density 2.205 and the second 2.124. They are made by dissolving the nickel trifluoroacetate tetrahydrate in trifluoroacetic acid either anhydrous or 1% hydrated.

Nickel naphthenate is used as a fuel additive to suppress smoke, as a rubber catalyst and as an oil additive.

When Nickel benzoate is heated in a vacuum, carbon dioxide, carbon monoxide, benzene, benzoic acid, phenol, biphenyl, nickel, nickel oxide, and nickel carbide are formed. It can crystallise as anhydrous, a trihydrate or a tetrahydrate.

Nickel terephthalate can be made by a double decomposition of sodium terephthalate and nickel nitrate. Nickel terephthalate precipitates. Its solubility is 0.38 g/100g water at 25 °C. In ammonium hydroxide a violet solution forms. Boiling acetic acid converts the nickel to nickel acetate. The terephthalate converts to a basic salt when boiled in water. Understating this compound is important when reducing coloured contaminants in polymers made from terephthalate.

Listing

References

Nickel compounds
Salts
Organic compounds